Caio Rangel da Silva (born 16 January 1996) is a Brazilian professional footballer who plays for Chapecoense as a right winger.

Club career 
Rangel joined the youth academy of Flamengo when he was 11 years old. Before joining, he scored 50 goals in a football tournament at Rio de Janeiro. Though he had a contract with Flamengo till February 2015, he signed a four-year professional contract with Italian club Cagliari in January 2014. Flamengo tried to renew his contract, but it went in vain, but secured "5% on the future sale" of Rangel. He commented "No one knows what is the right time to leave the country, but I have to think of me and my family. This weighs heavily in the decision. I thank all the professionals, because I learned a lot here. The crowd is wonderful and one day I want back and give joy to the nation, " He made his league debut against Sampdoria. In that match, he came as a 67th-minute substitute for Albin Ekdal. He played his second league match against Napoli, where he came as a 90th-minute substitute for Víctor Ibarbo. He made his Coppa Italia debut against Catania coming as a 56th-minute substitute for Brazilian goalscorer Diego Farias. He started for his club for the first time against Modena in the same competition, only to be later substituted by Farias. However it was reported in January 2015, that he was to be sold by his club as he became surplus.

On 29 January 2019 it was confirmed, that Rangel had joined Paraná Clube.

On 16 August 2020, Rangel signed a 1+1 year contract with Zira FK. Four months later, on 16 December 2020, Rangel left Zira by mutual consent.

Career statistics

International career 
Rangel played for the Brazil under-14 team in 2010. He played 14 times for Brazil under 17 scoring 3 goals in 2013. The first goal was scored against Peru under 17, which was followed by his two goals in 2013 FIFA U-17 World Cup, once against 
Slovakia under 17 and again against Honduras under 17.

Personal life 
In November 2010, Rangel's house in Complexo do Alemão was raided by military police in action against local violence. He lived in that house with his parents Robert and Adenilda.

References

External links

Living people
1996 births
Association football forwards
Brazilian footballers
Brazilian expatriate footballers
Cagliari Calcio players
F.C. Arouca players
Cruzeiro Esporte Clube players
Criciúma Esporte Clube players
G.D. Estoril Praia players
Esporte Clube Juventude players
Paraná Clube players
Esporte Clube São Bento players
Associação Ferroviária de Esportes players
Associação Chapecoense de Futebol players
Zira FK players
Serie A players
Primeira Liga players
Campeonato Brasileiro Série A players
Campeonato Brasileiro Série B players
Azerbaijan Premier League players
Brazil youth international footballers
Expatriate footballers in Italy
Expatriate footballers in Portugal
Expatriate footballers in Azerbaijan
Brazilian expatriate sportspeople in Italy
Brazilian expatriate sportspeople in Portugal
Brazilian expatriate sportspeople in Azerbaijan
Footballers from Rio de Janeiro (city)